Roland Blackmon (November 3, 1928 – May 4, 2017) was an American hurdler. He competed in the men's 400 metres hurdles at the 1952 Summer Olympics.

Blackman's hometown was New Orleans, Louisiana, and he was in the United States Army Signal Corps stationed in Nuremberg, Germany at the time he competed in the Olympics. He was also a boxer. He died in 2017.

References

External links
 

1928 births
2017 deaths
Athletes (track and field) at the 1952 Summer Olympics
American male hurdlers
American male boxers
Olympic track and field athletes of the United States
Track and field athletes from New Orleans
American expatriates in Germany